Robert Herman (Rob) Oudkerk (born 20 March 1955 in Amsterdam) is a Dutch politician and general practitioner. Oudkerk was born in Amsterdam. He was the son of a Jewish butcher and a nurse. His grandfather was David Cohen, who was President of the Jewish Council during World War II. He has served as a member of the Dutch House of Representatives for the Dutch Labour Party and as alderman of education in Amsterdam. During his time as a local politician in Amsterdam, he was beset by scandals, such as that he frequented a streetwalking zone for drug-addicted prostitutes, while still being a general practitioner.

References

External links 
 Decriminalize Prostitution Now Coalition article

1955 births
Living people
Aldermen of Amsterdam
Dutch Jews
Dutch general practitioners
Dutch political commentators
Jewish Dutch politicians
Labour Party (Netherlands) politicians
Members of the House of Representatives (Netherlands)
Municipal councillors of Amsterdam
Political scandals in the Netherlands